The Doune of Relugas is a hill fort located  south south west of Forres in Moray, Scotland. The site commands an uninterrupted view of the valley of the Findhorn as far as Culbin Sands, 9 miles to the north on the shore of the Moray Firth.

The hill fort was occupied from the 1st millennium BC through to the late 1st millennium AD. The enclosure is oval-shaped and has a gap to the east which may represent its entrance. Although there was no need for further defences to the east and south, there is an outer earthen rampart and ditch across the neck of the promontory to the north and west.

Stones from the rampart show evidence of vitrification, suggesting that the fort was burned at some point in its history. Other similarly sized vitrified forts within the area include Dun Evan, Dun Finlay and Dun Davie.

During the 19th century the remains of the Doune were incorporated as features into the designed picturesque landscape of the Relugas estate by the antiquarian and author Thomas Dick Lauder.

References

Hill forts in Scotland
Vitrified forts in Scotland
Archaeological sites in Moray
Iron Age sites in Scotland
Pictish sites in Scotland